Plasmodium achromaticum is a parasite of the genus Plasmodium subgenus Vinckeia. 

As in all Plasmodium species, P. achromaticum has both vertebrate and insect hosts. The vertebrate hosts for this parasite are mammals.

Taxonomy 
The parasite was first described by Yakimoff and Stolinikoff in 1912.

Vectors
Not known.

Hosts 
The only known host for this species is the bat Achromaticum versperuginus.

References 

achromaticum